Lepidophyma lowei, Lowe's tropical night lizard, is a species of lizard in the family Xantusiidae. It is a small lizard found in Mexico. It is known only from San Bartolome Zoogocho, in Zoogocho Municipality, in the Sierra Madre de Oaxaca of Oaxaca state at 2,200 meters elevation.

References

Lepidophyma
Endemic reptiles of Mexico
Fauna of the Sierra Madre de Oaxaca
Reptiles described in 1997
Taxa named by Robert L. Bezy